UOML can refer to:

 Unique Object Markup Language, an XML-based markup language
 Unstructured Operation Markup Language, an OASIS Standard